Mohamed Ali Krid (born 12 May 1991), also known as Mohamed Krid (Arabic: محمد قريد), is a Paralympian athlete from Tunisia competing mainly in category F34 throwing events.

He competed in the 2008 Summer Paralympics in Beijing, China. There he won a silver medal in the men's F33-34/52 javelin throw event.

References

External links 
 

1991 births
Living people
Tunisian male javelin throwers
Paralympic athletes of Tunisia
Paralympic silver medalists for Tunisia
Athletes (track and field) at the 2008 Summer Paralympics
Medalists at the 2008 Summer Paralympics
Paralympic medalists in athletics (track and field)
21st-century Tunisian people